CLAAS is an agricultural machinery manufacturer based in Harsewinkel, Germany, in the federal state of North Rhine Westphalia. Founded in 1913 by August Claas, CLAAS is a family business and one of the market and technology leaders in harvesting technology. It is the European market leader in combine harvesters and considered as world market leader in self-propelled forage harvesters. The product range also includes  tractors, balers, mowers, rakes, tedders, silage trailers, wheel loaders, telehandlers and other harvesting equipment as well as farming information technology. CLAAS employs around 11,500 employees worldwide and reported a turnover of roughly 3.9 billion euros in the 2019 financial year. About 78.5% of sales are generated outside of Germany.

History

Early days 
The beginnings of the company go back to 1887, when Franz Claas founded a company in Clarholz for the production of milk centrifuges. From about 1900 onwards, he also manufactured other agricultural machinery there, such as straw binders and cutters for mowing machines.

The official foundation of the company took place in 1913, when the son of Franz Claas, August Claas, informed the responsible office in Herzebrock that he was manufacturing straw binders with two locksmiths and one unskilled worker. In 1914 his brothers Franz jun. and Bernhard Claas also joined the company. The company was then continued under the name "Gebr. Claas". The fourth brother, Theo, officially joined the company as a partner in 1940.

Growth period 
After their return from the First World War, the Claas brothers and sisters moved their company to Harsewinkel in 1919, where they bought a disused hard stone factory and continued production. The export of Claas products now also began from Harsewinkel, initially to Holland, France and Belgium.

In 1930, the development of the first CLAAS combine harvester began, initially as machines using the fore-cut principle. The first CLAAS straw baler was produced in 1931. In 1936, the company launched the first combine harvester designed specifically for European harvesting conditions, the combine harvester (ger. Mäh-Dresch-Binder – MDB). This was then mass-produced from 1937. Until the production was stopped due to the war in 1943, approx. 1400 machines were produced.

At the same time as the 1000th combine harvester was built in 1942, development of the CLAAS SUPER began. This came onto the market in 1946. By the end of production in 1978, more than 65,000 units had been produced by this combine harvester family.

In 1956 a new factory was established in Paderborn. This was now the third location besides the plant in Harsewinkel and the Christopherus-Hütte in Gütersloh-Blankenhagen, which was built in 1948. In 1961, the new CLAAS baler factory in Metz (France) was added, which has been operating under the name Usines Claas France S.A. since 1969.

Helmut Claas, the son of August Claas, became managing director for Engineering in 1962. By then CLAAS was already the No. 1 combine harvester manufacturer in Europe. 1969 saw the takeover of Josef Bautz AG in Saulgau with a factory for forage harvesting machinery. One year later, the Speiser company from Göppingen, which specialised in forage harvesting technology. The company continued to grow steadily and presented new products for forage harvesting such as mowers, tedders, windrowers, loader wagons and trailed forage harvesters.

In 1978 Helmut Claas took over as chairman of the management board.

Establishment as a global agricultural technology company 
Since the 1990s, the company has strengthened its international presence in non-European countries. New production and sales locations were established in India (1989), the USA (1999), Russia (2005), China (2012/2014) and South America, among others. With the acquisition of a majority stake in Renault Agriculture in 2003, CLAAS expanded its product range to include standard tractors. On 11 February 2003, the 400,000th combine harvester left the production line at the main plant in Harsewinkel.

In 2011 the LEXION 770 set a Guinness World Record with 675.84 tonnes of grain harvested in eight hours.

With the construction of the new development center for electronics in Dissen, Lower Saxony, CLAAS set the course for another important future field in 2017: the digitalization of agriculture.

Since 1 October 2019 the company has been led by CEO Thomas Böck.

Product portfolio 
CLAAS is well known as harvest specialist, offering combine harvesters in various sizes. The largest model series is the LEXION, which has been produced since 1995 and is now in its fourth generation. The LEXION 8900 has a maximum output of 790 hp and is available with tyres or crawler tracks (TERRA TRAC) on the front axle. Both options allow a top speed of 31 mph (50 km/h). The cutterbars are up to 13.79 meters wide and the grain tank holds up to 18,000 liters. CLAAS offers also the two smaller combine product families, the TUCANO and AVERO.

In August 2021, CLAAS unveiled a new product line of harvesters called TRION. The range consists of the TRION 700, TRION 600, and TRION 500 series. They are powered by Cummins engines.

The CLAAS forage harvester is called JAGUAR. CLAAS is considered as world market leader in the silage chopper market.

The manufacturer produces and sells tractors from 47 hp to 530 hp. The XERION is the biggest tractor in the CLAAS product range, and is easy to recognize with four equally-sized wheels.

The AXION model series is available from 205 hp (AXION 800) to 445 hp in the AXION 960. Since 2019, CLAAS has offered an optional track system for the AXION 900 series, instead of the rear wheels, called TERRA TRAC.

The ARION model range consists of Tractors ranging from 95 hp (ARION 410) to 205 hp (ARION 660). THe ARION model range includes the ARION 400, ARION 500, ARION 600, and ARION 600C.

Company locations 

CLAAS is an international company active worldwide.

Harsewinkel, Germany 
Harsewinkel, CLAAS' headquarters, hosts the company's administration and a major factory.

Harsewinkel plant was opened in 1919. Combine harvesters have been manufactured here since 1936. To date, over 400,000 have been built. CLAAS produces also forage harvesters and the XERION tractor in Harsewinkel. Between 2000 and 2003, the factory was expanded so that not only finished machines but also individual components for other CLAAS plants can be produced. The machines manufactured at the main plant in Harsewinkel are transported about half by rail and half by truck. The choice of the means of transport depends mainly on the destination country. To Western Europe (especially Germany, France, Spain), transport is mainly by road. To the seaports of Bremen and Hamburg as well as to Southeast and Eastern Europe (especially Poland, Romania and former CIS states) rail transport is predominant. The importance of rail traffic is reflected in the fact that as early as 1967, a 3.1-kilometer-long connecting railway was built, leading from the Ibbenbüren – Gütersloh line of the Teutoburger Wald-Eisenbahn (TWE) to the company's own Harsewinkel-West works station.

Bad Saulgau, Germany 
CLAAS's facilities in Bad Saulgau develop, test and manufacture forage harvesting machines and attachments. Additionally, the chopper unit of the JAGUAR comes from this production site. The Bad Saulgau site is also home to a test center for forage harvesting technology and the CLAAS Group's Competence Center for Tractor-Implement-Automation (TIM).

Le Mans, France 
Following the acquisition of a majority stake in Renault Agriculture, CLAAS has also been offering a complete range of tractors since 2003. All CLAAS tractor models except of the XERION are manufactured at the Le Mans factory, two hours' drive southwest of Paris. In 2021, a three-year refurbishment of the factory was completed.

Metz, France 
At the CLAAS plant in Metz, 400 employees manufacture balers for the agricultural industry. Since the start of production in 1958, over 300,000 have been manufactured. Each type of baler is produced on its own welding and sheet metal processing line. This saves costly retooling and enables the simultaneous production of all models.

Törökszentmiklós, Hungary 
800 employees work at the Hungarian location Törökszentmiklós, southwest of Budapest. It has been part of the CLAAS Group since 1997 and has developed into the competence center for cutterbars and drum mowers.

Columbus, Indiana and Omaha, Nebraska, USA 
CLAAS machines have been harvesting in North American fields since the 1950s. Since the founding of the CLAAS of America (COA) sales company in 1979 and the subsequent laying of the foundation stone in Columbus, Indiana, in 1981, sales have been handled by CLAAS dealers. With the growing business in the USA, the spare parts department in Columbus, which is responsible for the entire USA and Canada, has also been greatly expanded.

The production company CLAAS Omaha (COL) has been manufacturing LEXION combine harvesters since 1999. COL is also jointly responsible for product development of the US machines. The plant is located in the largest grain growing areas in the USA and was initially operated in cooperation with Caterpillar – since 2002 fully owned by CLAAS. Today, the LEXION combine harvesters are no longer sold exclusively through Caterpillar dealers, but also through other distribution channels. Until 2019 the combines produced in Omaha had a yellow and black paint. With the start of the production of the new LEXION model series for the North American market at the factory in Omaha, Nebraska color scheme changed to the typical CLAAS green-white-red.

Krasnodar, Russia 
The factory in Krasnodar, located in the granary of Russia, started operations in 2005. This made CLAAS the first major agricultural engineering manufacturer to operate its own production facilities in Russia. The production facility in Krasnodar is designed for a capacity of 1,000 machines per year and aims to develop into a local center of excellence in agricultural engineering. In 2015, the company invested a further 120 million euros in the expansion of the plant. Combine harvesters are produced there including metalworking, painting and assembly.

Sunchales, Argentina 
As early as the 1950s, CLAAS sold harvesting machines to Argentina. The local subsidiary has existed since 2000 in Sunchales, Provinz Santa Fé. In addition, five further spare parts and service centers ensure that CLAAS service is guaranteed throughout Argentina.

In 2006 the possibility that CLAAS Argentina set up a factory in Argentina was tangible and by 2013, began to produce the TUCANO combine harvester, with a motor of 270 to 360 hp (Class VI or VIII). Models produced include the TUCANO 570, TUCANO 470 and TUCANO 560. At the same time, the company advanced assembly capacity.

In the town of Ameghino, Buenos Aires, CLAAS manufactures headers and other equipment and components.

Chandigarh, India 
CLAAS opened a plant near Chandigarh in 2008. It is located 300 km north of New Delhi, in the middle of the most fertile areas of Northern India. The plant is designed for a capacity of around 900 combine harvesters per year. The CROP TIGER combine harvester is mainly produced in the Chandigarh plant in both wheeled and TERRA TRAC tracked versions. With the crawler tracks, this machine is particularly suitable for wet soils and is therefore sold in Southern India, Sri Lanka, South Korea and other South-East Asian countries. The wheeled version of the CROP TIGER is mainly used in dry conditions such as in Northern India, the Middle East and Africa.

References

External links

 Official website
 Claas Museum
 Claas Tractors Specs 

 
Agricultural machinery manufacturers of Germany
Tractor manufacturers of Germany
German brands
Companies based in North Rhine-Westphalia
Manufacturing companies of Germany
Diesel engine manufacturers
Automotive transmission makers
Engine manufacturers of Germany